The BRM P180 was a Formula One racing car, built by BRM and designed by Tony Southgate which raced in the 1972 Formula One season. It was powered by a BRM 3.0-litre V12 engine. One of the main features of the P180 was that the radiators had moved to the rear of the car, allowing the nose of the car to be very wide and flat. It competed in five World Championship Grands Prix, with a total of seven individual entries. The car scored no World Championship points, its best finish being eighth at the 1972 Italian Grand Prix.

Race history
The car made its debut at the 1972 Spanish Grand Prix with Peter Gethin but retired when the engine failed. Howden Ganley drove the car at Monaco and retired through accident. The car did not reappear until the Italian Grand Prix, when it was driven by Jean-Pierre Beltoise and finished eighth. The Frenchman was joined by Canadian Bill Brack for Canada but Brack retired when he spun off and Beltoise also retired when he had an oil leak. For the United States Grand Prix, Brian Redman replaced Brack but he retired when his engine failed and Beltoise also retired when his ignition failed. The car won the non-championship 1972 World Championship Victory Race with Beltoise before being retired in favour of the older P160.

Complete Formula One World Championship results
(key)(results in bold indicate pole position, results in italics indicate fastest lap)

‡ All points were scored using BRM P160

References

BRM Formula One cars